Conde is a city in Spink County, South Dakota, United States. The population was 142 at the 2020 census.

History
Conde was platted in 1886. It was named after the Princes of Condé of France. A post office called Conde has been in operation since 1892.

Geography

Conde is located at  (45.156702, -98.098519).

Conde has been assigned the ZIP code 57434 and the FIPS place code 13700.

Demographics

2010 census
As of the census of 2010, there were 140 people, 76 households, and 46 families residing in the city. The racial makeup of the city was 100.0% White.

There were 76 households, of which 13.2% had children under the age of 18 living with them, 50.0% were married couples living together, 9.2% had a female householder with no husband present, 1.3% had a male householder with no wife present, and 39.5% were non-families. 38.2% of all households were made up of individuals, and 13.1% had someone living alone who was 65 years of age or older. The average household size was 1.84 and the average family size was 2.35.

The median age in the city was 54 years. 13.6% of residents were under the age of 18; 3.5% were between the ages of 18 and 24; 15% were from 25 to 44; 42.9% were from 45 to 64; and 25% were 65 years of age or older. The gender makeup of the city was 50.0% male and 50.0% female.

2000 census
As of the census of 2000, there were 187 people, 92 households, and 50 families residing in the city. The population density was 333.3 people per square mile (128.9/km2). There were 119 housing units at an average density of 212.1 per square mile (82.0/km2). The racial makeup of the city was 97.33% White, 2.14% Native American and 0.53% Asian.

There were 92 households, out of which 19.6% had children under the age of 18 living with them, 48.9% were married couples living together, 2.2% had a female householder with no husband present, and 44.6% were non-families. 41.3% of all households were made up of individuals, and 20.7% had someone living alone who was 65 years of age or older. The average household size was 2.03 and the average family size was 2.76.

In the city, the population was spread out, with 20.9% under the age of 18, 4.3% from 18 to 24, 25.1% from 25 to 44, 22.5% from 45 to 64, and 27.3% who were 65 years of age or older. The median age was 45 years. For every 100 females, there were 105.5 males. For every 100 females age 18 and over, there were 102.7 males.

The median income for a household in the city was $28,875, and the median income for a family was $41,250. Males had a median income of $26,667 versus $20,000 for females. The per capita income for the city was $17,481. About 7.4% of families and 15.1% of the population were below the poverty line, including 20.8% of those under the age of eighteen and 10.0% of those 65 or over.

References

Cities in South Dakota
Cities in Spink County, South Dakota